Duvar is a 1983 Turkish drama film directed by Yılmaz Güney produced in France. It was entered into the 1983 Cannes Film Festival.

Cast
 Tuncel Kurtiz as Tonton Ali
 Ayse Emel Mesci Kuray as the 'politique' (as Ayse Emel Mesci)
 Malik Berrichi as An arab
 Nicolas Hossein as Uzun, 'L'échalas'
 Isabelle Tissandier as Hatice, the bride
 Ahmet Ziyrek as Cafer
 Ali Berktay as Samil, groom
 Selahattin Kuzmoglu as prison director
 Jean-Pierre Colin as general director of the prisons
 Jacques Dimanche as Sevket, gardien-chef
 Ali Dede Altuntas as Pépé Ali
 Necdet Nakiboglu as Necdet
 Sema Kuray as little girl
 Zeynep Kuray as little girl
 Habes Bounabi as Tom
 Bernard Certeau as the lawyer
 Jérémie Nassif as Bonzo
 Christina Castillo as a pregnant woman

References

External links

 TurkishFilmChannel page for the film

1983 films
1983 drama films
1980s prison drama films
Turkish drama films
1980s Turkish-language films
Films set in Turkey
Films directed by Yılmaz Güney
Films produced by Marin Karmitz
Turkish multilingual films
French multilingual films
1980s French-language films
Zazaki-language films
Kurdish culture in France
1983 multilingual films
Films shot in Ankara